The canton of Roquemaure is an administrative division of the Gard department, southern France. Its borders were modified at the French canton reorganisation which came into effect in March 2015. Its seat is in Roquemaure.

It consists of the following communes:
 
Codolet
Laudun-l'Ardoise
Lirac
Montfaucon
Roquemaure
Saint-Geniès-de-Comolas
Saint-Laurent-des-Arbres
Saint-Paul-les-Fonts
Saint-Victor-la-Coste
Sauveterre
Tavel

References

Cantons of Gard